Tatikios or Taticius (c. 1048 - died after 1110) was an Eastern Roman general of Turkish origin during the reign of Alexius I Comnenus. His name is also rendered as Tetigus, Tatizius, Tatitius, Tatic, or Tetig.

Origins and early life
The father of Tatikios was a "Saracen", probably meaning a Turk, who was captured by Alexius' father John Comnenus and who served as a slave in the Comnenus household. Tatikios and Alexius grew up together. Tatikios is described as an oikogenes of Alexius (that is, "from the same house"). 

In 1078, before Alexius became emperor, Tatikios accompanied him in battle against his rival Nicephorus Basilacius. During this campaign Tatikios discovered Basilacius' plans for an ambush. When Alexius became emperor in 1081 Tatikios  held the office of megas primikerios in the imperial household. Later that year he commanded the "Turks living around Ochrida", perhaps Hungarians at the Battle of Dyrrhachium against Robert Guiscard.

Military and political career
In 1086 Tatikios was sent to Nicaea in an attempt to recapture it from the Seljuks. He was forced to retreat when he learned that Seljuk reinforcements were on their way. Alexius sent Tatikios back with naval assistance from Manuel Boutoumites. Although Tatikios was able to defeat Abu'l Qasim, in Bithynia, he could not recapture the city. At the end of the year Tatikios was recalled and sent to fight the Pechenegs, who were assisting the heretical Manichaeans in revolt against Alexius, near Philippopolis. In 1087 Tatikios commanded the Byzantine right wing in the Battle of Dristra against the Pechenegs, and in 1090 he defeated a small force of 300 Pechenegs while leading the Archontopouloi tagma against them.

In early 1094, Tatikios was placed in charge of guarding Alexius' tent at Pentegostis. Here he discovered the plot of Nikephoros Diogenes, son of the former emperor Romanus IV Diogenes, to kill the emperor. Nicephorus was an old friend of Alexius and Tatikios and Alexius was reluctant to punish him, but it was clear that Nicephorus was ambitious for the throne. Nicephorus was exiled and was eventually blinded. Later in 1094, Tatikios attended the synod of Blachernae which condemned Bishop Leo of Chalcedon, presumably performing some function of security. In the records of this synod Tatikios is given the court title of protoproedros.

In 1095 Tatikios accompanied Alexius in the campaign against the Cumans.

Role during the First Crusade
In 1096 Tatikios defended Constantinople from peasant crusaders who attacked the city after their arrival. In 1097 Tzitas, commanding 2000 peltasts, was sent by Alexius to Nicaea to assist the Crusaders in their siege of the city. The Frankish chronicler Albert of Aix says that Tatikios acted as an envoy between the Turks and the crusaders, but according to the more reliable Anna Comnena, he was working with Boutoumites to negotiate the surrender of the city without the Crusaders' knowledge. This caused a deep rift between the Latins and Greeks. 

However, Tatikios was ordered to accompany the Crusaders across Anatolia, both as a guide and also to ensure that any former Byzantine territory re-captured was returned to the Empire. After leaving Nicaea, the Crusaders split into two groups. Tatikios accompanied the Norman (under Guiscard's son Bohemund of Taranto, Bohemund's nephew Tancred, and Robert of Normandy) and Flemish (under Robert of Flanders) contingents. The Gesta Francorum records that Tatikios frequently warned the Crusaders of the ferocity of the Turks. 

During the siege of Antioch, Raymond of Aguilers writes that Tatikios advised the Crusaders to disperse and capture the surrounding countryside before attacking the city itself, which would also help them avoid a famine (this advice was ignored). In February 1098 he left the siege; according to Anna, who probably talked to Tatikios personally or had access to his reports, Tatikios was informed by Bohemund that the other Crusaders mistrusted him and had threatened his life. Bohemund, on the other hand, spread the rumour that Tatikios was a coward and a traitor, and had fled the army never intending to return, despite his promises to bring back reinforcements and provisions from Constantinople. This is the account preserved in contemporary crusader chronicles, who refer to him as a great enemy and a liar (periurio manet et manebit, according to the Gesta Francorum); Anna's account, of course, may be influenced by her deep prejudice against Bohemund, a long-standing enemy of her father.

The accusation of betrayal against Tatikios appears to be unjustified. The Byzantine general had left his personal possessions in the crusader camp and hence forfeited them. More conclusively, on 4 March 1098, a few weeks after the departure of Tatikios, a fleet bearing food supplies and siege materials for the crusader army outside Antioch arrived at the port of St Simeon. The modern historian Peter Frankopan suggests that Alexius was by now confident enough in the established links between Byzantium and the leaders of the crusade to retain his liaison officer in Constantinople for other duties.

Appearance and descendants
The Crusade chroniclers mention that Tatikios had a mutilated nose. Mutilation of the face was a common Byzantine punishment for traitors but this does not appear to be the case in this instance. According to Guibert of Nogent he had a prosthetic gold nose as a replacement. Contrary to the Crusaders' opinions of him, Anna describes him as "a valiant fighter, a man who kept his head under combat conditions," and "a clever orator and a powerful man of action." Anna also tells the story that Tatikios and Alexius were playing polo when the general was thrown from his horse and landed on the emperor. Alexius injured his knee in the incident and was thereafter afflicted by gout. Anna does not mention the date of this incident; it is an aside in her account of Alexius' campaigns against the Turks around 1110. 

There is no record of the dates of Tatikios' birth or death. Although the office of Grand Primicerius (megas primikerios) was usually held by a eunuch, some records suggest Tatikios had descendants who were members of a powerful noble family in the 12th century, including another general, prominent at the Battle of Sirmium, under Manuel I Comnenus. A possible descendant, Constantine Tatikios, was deprived of his sight following a failed plot against Isaac Angelos.

Notes

References
Primary:

Secondary:
Steven Runciman, A History of the Crusades, Vol. 1: The First Crusade. Cambridge, 1952.
 
Albert of Aix, Historia Hierosolymitana.
Gesta Francorum et aliorum Hierosolimitanorum (anonymous)
Guibert of Nogent, Dei gesta per Francos.
Peter Tudebode, Historia de Hierosolymitano itinere.
Raymond of Aguilers, Historia Francorum qui ceperunt Iherusalem.
 Charles M. Brand, "The Turkish Element in Byzantium, Eleventh-Twelfth Centuries", Dumbarton Oaks Papers 43:1-25 (1989) at JSTOR
Magdalino, Paul (2002). The Empire of Manuel I Komnenos, 1143–1180. Cambridge University Press. .

Byzantine generals
Christians of the First Crusade
11th-century Byzantine military personnel
1040s births
12th-century deaths
Year of birth uncertain
Year of death unknown
Generals of Alexios I Komnenos
12th-century Byzantine military personnel